Titãs - A Vida Até Parece Uma Festa (lit. Titãs - Life Even Looks Like a Party) is a 2008 documentary featuring the career of the Brazilian rock band Titãs since its beginning. Features the tapes recorded by Branco Mello when he earned his VHS camera in the early 1980s. Was awarded the 2009 VMB Award for Musical Movie/Documentary of the Year.

Background 
Branco Mello used his camera to record several moments in shows, studios, hotel rooms, airports and any other kind of backstage actions. He and his band mates recorded the images and sound in formats such as VHS, Hi-8, Super 8 e mini DV.

In 2002, Branco Mello invited the award-winning Oscar Rodrigues Alves, who had already directed the promotional clip for "Epitáfio", to write and direct the film. together they selected videos among the more than 200 hours of recorded material. They also searched at television networks for promotional videos, talk shows and interviews. All that material together was able to tell the story of the band through shows, national and international tours, music festivals and important moments like the death of Marcelo Fromer and the departure of Arnaldo Antunes and Nando Reis. It took them six years to edit the film, because they would only be able to do that during their freetime.

References

External links 
 
 Titãs - A Vida Até Parece Uma Festa at Moviemobz.com
 

2008 films
Brazilian documentary films
2000s Portuguese-language films
Documentary films about rock music and musicians
Titãs
2008 documentary films